An O-methyltransferase (OMT) is a type of methyltransferase enzyme transferring a methyl group on a molecule.

Examples are :
 Acetylserotonin O-methyltransferase
 Apigenin 4'-O-methyltransferase
 Caffeate O-methyltransferase
 Caffeoyl-CoA O-methyltransferase
 Catechol O-methyltransferase
 Chlorophenol O-methyltransferase
 Columbamine O-methyltransferase
 Demethylmacrocin O-methyltransferase
 3'-demethylstaurosporine O-methyltransferase
 Demethylsterigmatocystin 6-O-methyltransferase
 3-demethylubiquinone-9 3-O-methyltransferase
 3,7-dimethylquercetin 4'-O-methyltransferase
 Fatty-acid O-methyltransferase
 Glucuronoxylan 4-O-methyltransferase
 10-hydroxydihydrosanguinarine 10-O-methyltransferase
 12-hydroxydihydrochelirubine 12-O-methyltransferase
 6-hydroxymellein O-methyltransferase
 3'-hydroxy-N-methyl-(S)-coclaurine 4'-O-methyltransferase
 8-hydroxyquercetin 8-O-methyltransferase
 Iodophenol O-methyltransferase
 Isobutyraldoxime O-methyltransferase
 (iso)eugenol O-methyltransferase
 Isoflavone 4'-O-methyltransferase
 Isoflavone 7-O-methyltransferase
 Isoliquiritigenin 2'-O-methyltransferase
 Isoorientin 3'-O-methyltransferase
 Jasmonate O-methyltransferase
 Protein-L-isoaspartate(D-aspartate) O-methyltransferase
 Kaempferol 4'-O-methyltransferase
 Licodione 2'-O-methyltransferase
 Loganate O-methyltransferase
 Luteolin O-methyltransferase
 Macrocin O-methyltransferase
 Methylquercetagetin 6-O-methyltransferase
 3-methylquercetin 7-O-methyltransferase
 mRNA (nucleoside-2'-O-)-methyltransferase
 Myricetin O-methyltransferase
 N-benzoyl-4-hydroxyanthranilate 4-O-methyltransferase
 O-demethylpuromycin O-methyltransferase
 6-O-methylnorlaudanosoline 5'-O-methyltransferase
 Phenol O-methyltransferase
 Polysaccharide O-methyltransferase
 Protein-glutamate O-methyltransferase
 Protein-S-isoprenylcysteine O-methyltransferase
 Quercetin 3-O-methyltransferase
 rRNA (adenosine-2'-O-)-methyltransferase
 (RS)-norcoclaurine 6-O-methyltransferase
 (S)-scoulerine 9-O-methyltransferase
 Sterigmatocystin 8-O-methyltransferase
 Tabersonine 16-O-methyltransferase
 Tetrahydrocolumbamine 2-O-methyltransferase
 Tocopherol O-methyltransferase
 tRNA guanosine-2'-O-methyltransferase
 Vitexin 2"-O-rhamnoside 7-O-methyltransferase
 Xanthotoxol O-methyltransferase

Transferases
O-methylation